Richard X. Heyman (born 1951) is an American singer-songwriter and musician. Heyman is a founding member of the Doughboys.

Biography
Heyman was born in 1951 and raised in Plainfield, New Jersey.  He started banging on things when he was five, got a full drum kit when he was seven, and was an accomplished drummer by the time he was twelve.  He picked up guitar and piano in his teens, which was also when he began writing songs.  He was one of the original members of the 60s group, The Doughboys, who are considered to be a legendary New Jersey garage rock band.  He would later go solo, in his twenties, following the breakup of the original Doughboys.

Heyman's influences are as varied as Bernstein to The Beatles, Richard Rodgers to the Rascals, and the Blues to The Byrds. He has drummed for such artists as Brian Wilson, Link Wray, Jonathan Richman and the Left Banke's Michael Brown, composer of "Walk Away Renee". He also played keyboards for the legendary Ben E. King and guitar for the lead singer of The Shangri-Las, Mary Weiss. In live performance, Richard leads his own band on guitar and keyboards.

From 2000-2019, Heyman played with the re-united Doughboys as their drummer and contributing songwriter. He and his wife, Nancy, live in Manhattan.

Discography
Heyman released his first indie EP, Actual Size, a collection of six of his finest songs recorded on an 8-track Tascam machine in a home studio, in 1987, the same studio in which Richard would subsequently record his album Living Room!!, released in 1988.

Albums
Living Room!! (1988)Hey Man! (1990)Cornerstone (1998) Basic Glee (2002) Rightovers (2003) Actual Sighs (2007) Intakes (2009) Tiers and Other Stories (2011) X (2013)Y (2014)Incognito (2017)Pop Circles (2019)Copious Notes (2021)67,000 Miles An Album (2022)

EP'sActual Size (1986) Heyman, Hoosier & Herman (2001)

SinglesVacation" b/w "Takin' My Chances (1980)

Others
As a composer, Heyman is co-writer of "My Love for You" on track 3 of Smokey Robinson & the Miracles, The Tears of a Clown (1970). The song also appears on track 4 of Ramsey Lewis' Funky Serenity'' (1973).

References

External links
 Richard X. Heyman's Website

Songwriters from New Jersey
American male singers
Singers from New Jersey
1951 births
Jangle pop groups
Living people
Musicians from Plainfield, New Jersey
Sire Records artists
American male songwriters